The Auto Union 1000 is a luxury compact front-wheel drive automobile manufactured by Auto Union GmbH between 1958 and 1965.  It was the first (and in many markets the last) model branded as an Auto Union by the manufacturer since the 1930s; it replaced the DKW 3=6, although the latter continued in production, until the end of 1959. The two cars were broadly similar, but the new car had its two-stroke engine enlarged to 981 cc yielding a 10% - 37% (depending on model) power increase.

The development of the model
The Auto Union 1000 was an evolution of the earlier DKW F93 and F94 models of the 3=6 series.

Apart from the enlarged engine, which now provided  in the base model, the 1000 featured the old four-ring Auto Union badge across the grille along with the Auto Union name above it, in place of the DKW badge that had adorned the nose of the earlier models, as well as a smooth boot (trunk) lid.

For the European market there were three distinct series of the 1000/1000S ; (not including the 1000SP or 1000 engined  DKW Munga);

The first series was known as the "model 58" or AU1000/58, which was available as the 1000 Coupe de luxe only with the 44 PS engine. This model was available for 1958/59 only and was released in late 1957.

The second series was known as the "model 60" or AU1000/60 - which, in two door form was the first model to feature the "panoramic" windscreen.

The third and final series was known as the "model 62" or AU1000/62, which was an improved version of the "model 60" - featuring front disc brakes, Lubrimat, wider track rear axle, larger boot and other refinements.

The first car of the "model 60" line was a 1000S Coupe chassis number 6820000001, completed at Düsseldorf on 27 July 1959. There were 25 pre-production cars built. The first production 1000/1000S was chassis number 6820000026. Over time the "model 60" 1000 series gained a four-door and Universal in the range, all produced at Düsseldorf. Production of all "model 60" second series cars was switched to the third series "model 62" on 29 September 1961.

Production of the third series of 1000/1000S was gradually closed from late 1962. The final 1000 Universal was completed on 31 October 1962, and the final 1000S four door on 13 November, in both cases at Ingolstadt. The details of the final European 1000S assembled are unknown, as the final batch of production contained CKD and SKD (Completely Knocked Down and Semi Knocked Down) kits, which were assembled later, outside Germany. The final European 1000/1000S manufactured (note, not assembled) though, was a 1000S Coupe de Luxe chassis number 6820146387.

Body options
In addition to the two- and four-door saloons, a "pillarless" Coupe  shared the profile of the saloons apart from the absence of any fixed B pillar. A three-door station wagon version was also offered (essentially, an updated DKW F94U), now branded as the 1000 Universal, between 1959 and 1962 (1959/60/61 only for right hand drive). For the new decade, the coupe and four door was renamed Auto Union 1000S. In August 1959, an eye-catching wrap-around windscreen with vertical strip speedometer was introduced on the two door models of the "model 60" series (AU1000 limousine, AU1000 Coupe and AU1000S Coupe). Neither the windscreen nor the name changes entirely concealed the fact that at a time when competitor designs employed the modern ponton, three-box form, this Auto Union's body along with most of its technical features descended directly from that of the Zwickau-developed DKW F9 prototype of 1938. Fortunately in 1938, the front-wheel drive DKW design had been an innovative one.

Appearing in 1958 was the Auto Union 1000 Sp, a low-slung, two-seater sports car that was produced for Auto Union by the Stuttgart coach builders, Baur. The fixed-head version was joined in 1961 by a cabriolet. The 1000 Sp was lower, but not (assuming only two people were in the car) significantly lighter than the standard-bodied saloon; a claimed maximum speed of 140 km/h (87 mph), nevertheless, put its performance at the top of the range. It proved to be the last open-top car produced by the company until the Audi 80 cabriolet in 1994.

Motorsport Success 
The model's worldwide Motorsport success in the late 1950s and early 1960s, where several outright victories, such as the 1959 Acropolis Rally (Wolfgang Levy, Hans Wenscher), South African National Rally Championship in 1961, 1962 and 1963 (Reinhard Muhl and Pieter Muhl (1963 with Jan Hettema)) and many others, brought it fame along with class wins in many more events such the 1960 Monte Carlo Rally.

These cars remained competing at Motorsport events into the 1970s in countries such as Sri Lanka and South Africa, where they were still rallied with enthusiasm.

Auto Union - Auto Union in Argentina 
In Argentina, the 1000 was manufactured under license by Industrias Automotriz de Santa Fe (IASF) between 1960 and 1970, in the city of Sauce Viejo, Santa Fe. The lineup consisted of the two- and four-door sedans, the three-door Universal estate (station wagon),  and the Carrozzeria Fissore-designed Coupé and Spyder "1000 SE" on the basis of German 1000 Sp. These were more elegant and departed from the visual appearance of the Ford Thunderbird, the "Fissore Coupé" stood out with one-piece front bumpers and longer wrap-around bumpers in back, an alternate roof line, side louvers in the front fenders between the front wheel cut outs, and doors adorned with chrome strips and an elegantly appointed interior. Only limited numbers of the coupé were built and are highly sought out by collectors. Licensed productions of the coupés and Spyder were also carried out in Spain.

The Coupé Fissore had many famous owners (Julio Sosa, César Luis Menotti, and others). Other important models were the Auto Union 1000 S (21,797 Sedán made until 1969), the Auto Union Combi/Pick-up, and the Auto Union 1000 Universal S (6,396 made until 1969, too). The last version of the Auto Union Combi/Pick-up launched in 1969 but only remained on sale for a few months. Afterwards, IME used the cabs for this model.

Auto Union 1000S cars have, more recently, featured prominently in Argentinian films such as The Games Maker and The German Doctor (Wakolda).

Performance

Bill Boddy, the editor of the British magazine Motor Sport wrote in 1960 of the 1000S Coupe; "The manner in which this roomy 980-c.c. saloon leaves larger cars as its driver weaves through the traffic, making full use of the excellent acceleration, is well calculated to captivate enthusiasts, particularly those who esteem unorthodox cars and the two-cycle power unit."

The test car cost £1259 including taxes on the UK market. In the same year, the much larger Austin Westminster retailed for only £1148 in the UK, reflecting, in particular, the extent to which British automakers were still protected by import tariffs in their home market.

Technical
The Auto Union's 981-cc two-stroke three-cylinder engine was available in various states of tune. Power was delivered via a four-speed manual gearbox, controlled using a column-mounted lever. The electrical system was six-volt.

The suspension arrangement was carried over verbatim from the earlier DKW 3=6, which meant that handling followed the surefooted behaviour of the earlier model too;

Sports Cars Illustrated magazine January 1959 edition wrote of the 1000 Coupe de luxe;

"Probably the most striking impression of the AU1000 is its extraordinarily high cornering power. It took us a while to learn to keep our foot flat on the floor when cornering at speeds so high that a more conventional car would swap ends. On a loose gravel surface the stability and "sticktion" of the DKW borders on the incredible and we began to understand the reasons why and how these cars have enjoyed such tremendous success in international rallies. One has the impression that a driver can pound the car without mercy, flog it for all its worth and it will come back for more. The Auto Union 1000 is a rugged automobile, its beefy leaf springs and solid frame as well as the unburstable 980cc engine, all substantiating this impression"

In 1961 (for the 1962 models), the so-called Clean Oil Regulator “Frischölautomatik” or "Lubrimat" was introduced, a system incorporating a separate oil tank and pump to dispense the oil, which in a two-stroke engine, is mixed with the fuel ahead of combustion. The stated purpose was to reduce the characteristic blue smoke emission for which the car was known. This was to be achieved by ensuring that oil was introduced in exactly the correct 1:40 proportion to the fuel, and the device was advertised as a way to improve engine longevity. The timing of this innovation proved unfortunate as the winter of 1962-63 was an exceptionally cold one in Europe. The Auto Union 1000 model experienced an unexpected increase in crankshaft damage because the oil, its viscosity affected by the cold weather, was unable to flow freely through the narrow feeder pipe in the carburettor. The USA-born Dr William Werner  (the Technical Director of Auto Union) together with the Auto Union chief designer, Oskar Siebler, had the idea of the unique two stroke oiling system "Lubrimat" while drinking their coffee in the Alpine Franzenshöhe cafe - on 17 March 1959. In their words, whereas the two stroke engine was a remarkable power unit, "its malodorous blue-smoky smell" offended people.  The Lubrimat was intended to fix this.  This invention, while noteworthy at the time, ultimately hastened the death of two stroke automotive engines in the world outside Eastern Europe. It was touted as "Sensation at the International Automobile Exhibition 1961". After that cup of coffee - Werner and Siebler filed a patent for the Lubrimat in April 1959.

Commercial
The Düsseldorf plant (in the old Rheinmetall - Borsig factory)  produced 171,008 Auto Union 1000s during the six-year model run. The pretty 1000 Sp sports version continued in production for another two years, until 1965, notching up sales around 5,000 for the hard-top version and 1,640 for the cabriolet. The production of the car was extensively shown in the 1960 film "Träume, die Sie kaufen können".

The car was sold worldwide and was popular in markets where its characteristics suited the local conditions well. Export sales were especially strong in Africa and the car was well regarded for its robust and reliable construction.  In countries where its sporting heritage is especially strong, such as South Africa, the car has since acquired a legendary status. In 2012, the South African artist Steve Hofmeyr released a song, "DKW" which, taking in the Auto Union 1000, expressed a nostalgia for the car as a representation of solidity and reliability.

Import tariffs made the Auto Union 1000 a costly car in certain markets, and sales were slow in countries where the 1960s "Buy British" campaigns were effective. In New Zealand, for example, a 1960 Auto Union 1000S could be bought from Crosbie Motors in Invercargill for £1578 at a time when larger cars were selling for significantly less.

The Auto Union 1000 also enjoyed much publicity from being prominently featured in European films of the day, such as the German musical comedy Hula-Hopp, Conny, the German Comedy Robert and Bertram  and the Swedish film  Mannekäng i rött .  In 1970, well after the car's production ended, an Auto Union 1000S featured as the star in the German comedy film Das kann doch unsren Willi nicht erschüttern.

As with its predecessor, the DKW 3=6, the Auto Union 1000 enjoyed the attention of a number of famous owners, such as the famous aviator, Elly Beinhorn (her white and red 1958 Auto Union 1000 Coupe was named "Alwine VIII"), Big band bandleader Max Greger (1000SP), Graf von Brandenstein-Zeppelin (1000SP) and German fashion designer Katja Nieborg (1000S Coupe).

The end of production
In 1963, the Auto Union 1000 gave way in Europe to its successor, the contemporary-looking DKW F102 - the last model to wear either the Auto Union or DKW badges before the company was acquired by Volkswagen and the dormant Audi brand was resurrected. The 1000 was also the last Auto Union/DKW model to be produced at the Düsseldorf factory before production was moved to the company's new plant in Ingolstadt; the old factory was sold to Auto Union's then parent company Daimler-Benz to be converted to a Mercedes truck and van assembly plant.

The older-model DKW 3=6 continued in production in a slightly modified form in Brazil until 1967, but it was produced without modification in Santa Fe, Argentina, until late 1969, with about 30,000 cars manufactured.

Present day - collectors and enthusiasts 
In various countries, such as Brazil and South Africa, there are a significant amount of Auto Union 1000 cars still in everyday use. Additionally, there enthusiast clubs in many countries worldwide. These are served by a number of parts specialists in Europe and South America. The largest club is the Auto Union Veteranen Club e.V. (AUVC)

The AUVC normally co-ordinates an annual "Treffen" of DKW and Auto Union cars in Europe, whereas in South America, a large annual gathering of these cars, "Blue Cloud" occurs every August in Brazil at Poços de Caldas.

Gallery

Data

Sources and further reading

1000
Compact cars
Front-wheel-drive vehicles
1960s cars
Cars introduced in 1958